The 1972 Buffalo Bills season was the franchise's 3rd season in the National Football League, and the 13th overall.  It was also their last season at War Memorial Stadium which had been their home field since the franchise started in 1960.

Season summary
The 1972 season also marked the return of former Bills coach Lou Saban, who had previously led the team to two AFL Championships.

Saban had a new offensive philosophy for Buffalo in 1972: in his first three seasons, former number one overall pick O. J. Simpson had only carried the ball an average of 161 times per season. Saban rushed Simpson 292 times in 1972, the second-most in the league.

Despite losing two starting offensive lineman – center Bruce Jarvis and guard Jim Reilly—in the season opener, O. J. Simpson still led the league in rushing with 1,251 yards.

Although the Bills had a potent, yard-gaining rushing attack, they could not put enough points on the scoreboard, scoring only 257 points (18.3 per game) all season, 19th in the league. Furthermore, Buffalo's defense gave up 377 points (23.5 per game), the third-most in the NFL in 1972.

As of 2022, this season was the most recent in which the Bills recorded a tie game.

Offseason

NFL Draft

Personnel

Staff/Coaches

Roster

 October 16 – Haven Moses (WR) was traded to Denver for

Regular season
In his fourth NFL season, running back O. J. Simpson gained over 1,000 yards rushing for the first time. The 24-23 loss on October 22 to the Miami Dolphins, who would finish with a perfect season, was the closest margin of victory for the Dolphins.

Schedule

Season summary

Week 1

Week 2

    
    
    
    
    
    
    
    
    

O. J. Simpson 29 Rush, 138 Yds

Week 13 vs Lions

Standings

Awards and honors

References

 Bills on Pro Football Reference
 Bills on jt-sw.com
 Bills Stats on jt-sw.com

Buffalo Bills seasons
Buffalo Bills
Buffalo